Toulouse Fontaines Club was a football club based in Toulouse, France. Their stadium was in the rue des Fontaines, in the Saint-Cyprien suburb of Toulouse. The club was dissolved in 2016 as part of a merger with Toulouse Saint-Jo Football SC to form Toulouse Métropole FC.

History
In 1978, the Toulouse Fontaines Club achieved promotion to the newly formed Division 4, thus leaving their regional league to play in a national competition for the first time. Since then, they never went back to regional football, always playing in D4 and D3, and CFA and CFA 2 after the reform of French leagues.

In 1997, they reached the Round of 32 of the Coupe de France, losing 2–0 to Bordeaux.

References

Defunct football clubs in France
1932 establishments in France
2016 disestablishments in France
Association football clubs established in 1932
Association football clubs disestablished in 2016
Sport in Toulouse
Football clubs in Occitania (administrative region)